South Moreton Castle was an 11th-century castle in the village of South Moreton, Oxfordshire, (historically in Berkshire until the 1974 reorganisation), England. The name can also refer to a nearby siege-castle, probably from the 12th century.

History

South Moreton Castle is an 11th-century Norman motte and bailey design that overlooks Mill Brook in the village of South Moreton, lying close to the village church. The motte was damaged during the late Victorian period, and a  embankment stretching away from the castle to the west may have been destroyed around that time. Local tradition states that some victims of the English Civil War in the 17th century were buried upon the motte. The castle is a scheduled monument.

Just to the north of the main South Moreton Castle is another fortification, probably dating from the civil war of the Anarchy in the 12th century. An alternative opinion is that this moat was in fact associated with the nearby manor house, and that the siege castle referred to in the 1140s was in fact the first castle overlooking Mill Brooke.

See also
Castles in Great Britain and Ireland
List of castles in England

Bibliography
 Betts, W.J. (1910) "South Moreton," Berkshire, Buckinghamshire and Oxfordshire Archaeological Journal Vol. 15, p. 73.
 Spurrell, M. (1995) "Containing Wallingford Castle, 1146-53.", Oxoniensia 60, pp257–270.

References

Castles in Oxfordshire